Jean Luchaire (21 July 1901 – 22 February 1946) was a French journalist and politician who became the head of the French collaborationist press in Paris during the German military occupation. Luchaire supported the Révolution nationale declared by the French Government after it relocated to the spa town of Vichy in 1940.

Family
Jean Luchaire was born in Siena, Italy, a grand-nephew of historian Achille Luchaire. He was married, with four children.

Inter-war years
Before World War II Luchaire frequented the French Chamber of Deputies, where Aristide Briand had begun a strong association with Luchaire, the latter's newspaper supported Briand's policy for a rapprochement with Germany (while it was still the Weimar Republic). Manchester Guardian journalist Robert Dell is on record as saying that Luchaire was "most frightfully corrupt", and in 1934 Foreign Minister Louis Barthou related that Luchaire was receiving "quite incredible" subsidies for his newspaper Notre Temps (which Luchaire had founded in 1927), some 100,000 francs a month from Joseph Paul-Boncour.

Jean Luchaire first met and became friends with Otto Abetz, a "francophile" (who later became German Ambassador in Paris during World War II), in 1930, when Abetz was still living in Karlsruhe. Abetz later married Luchaire's secretary, Suzanne. Luchaire was convinced that the appointment of Abetz as Ambassador to Paris was a godsend to France and that, between them, he and Abetz could moderate the rigours of the German military occupation and prepare the ground for a happy Franco-German union. He suggested that, in effect, he was adapting his old Briandism to new conditions.

Vichy years
Pierre Laval, aware of Luchaire's friendly relations with Abetz, sent him to Paris in July 1940 to re-establish contact with him. Luchaire consistently maintained that he represented a certain respectable "rightist" anti-British French political tradition. He founded a further newspaper, the evening daily Les Nouveaux Temps, in 1940, and subsequently became the President of the Association de la presse parisienne (Association of the Parisian Press) in 1941 and presided the Corporation nationale de la presse française (National Corporation of French Press). During  the occupation, however, it was claimed that Luchaire was disseminating Nazi propaganda, fulminating against England, America, de Gaulle, the Soviet Union, Bolshevism and the Maquis. By the end of 1943 he advocated a "real" collaborationist government, Laval being, in his opinion, "inadequate". During the occupation, as editor of Nouveaux Temps, he drew a salary of 100,000 francs a month, besides 'extras', lived in great luxury, lunched at the Tour d'Argent and according to his daughter Corinne, even started keeping expensive mistresses, which he had not done in the past.

In 1944, Luchaire called on the Germans to "exterminate" the French Resistance, and his newspapers wrote violent anti-British and anti-American articles after the Normandy landings. He was appointed Minister of Information in the French government-in-exile, after the Germans forcibly removed it from Vichy to the Sigmaringen enclave, 1944–5, where, apparently, he continued to be optimistic. He fled to Italy in 1945, but was later arrested and returned to France. He was tried by a tribunal consisting of broad Left appointees, even communist members of the resistance, and executed.

Luchaire's daughter Corinne had become a film actress in the 1930s. Following her father's "joke trial", she regarded him as a martyr, "who had never wanted to harm anyone, who was sincere, and who never thought unkindly of any man." In 1945, she also was sentenced to ten years of dégradation nationale. She died of tuberculosis in 1950.

References

Politique Pour Tous :: Jean LUCHAIRE

Bibliography
 Cédric Meletta, Jean Luchaire. l'enfant perdu des années sombres, Paris, Perrin, 2013, 450 p.
 Martin Mauthner, Otto Abetz and His Paris Acolytes - French Writers Who Flirted with Fascism, 1930–1945. Sussex Academic Press, 2016,

1901 births
1946 deaths
Politicians from Siena
Nazi collaborators shot at the Fort de Châtillon
Executed Italian people
French male non-fiction writers
French politicians convicted of crimes
20th-century French journalists
20th-century French male writers
Italian emigrants to France